Valmondois is a railway station located in the commune of Butry-sur-Oise (Val-d'Oise department), France. The station is served by Transilien H trains Creil - Pontoise and Paris - Saint-Leu-la-Forêt - Persan-Beaumont. The daily number of passengers was between 500 and 2,500 in 2002.

History

Valmondois is located on the original Paris - Lille line, opened on 20 June 1846 by Compagnie des chemins de fer du Nord (Nord Railway Company).  This line passed along the Montmorency Valley (Ermont-Eaubonne), and headed towards the Northeast at Saint-Ouen-l'Aumône, continuing through the Oise valley. In 1859, a more direct line along Chantilly was opened. The Ermont-Eaubonne - Valmondois branch line via Saint-Leu-la-Forêt was opened in 1876. Between 1886 and 1949, a branch line existed from Valmondois to Marines

The line Pontoise - Creil was electrified in 1969, the line Ermont-Eaubonne - Valmondois in December 1970.

See also
List of SNCF stations in Île-de-France

References

External links

 

Railway stations in Val-d'Oise
Railway stations in France opened in 1846